Iodine pentafluoride is an interhalogen compound with chemical formula IF5. It is one of the fluorides of iodine.  It is a colorless liquid, although impure samples appear yellow. It is used as a fluorination reagent and even a solvent in specialized syntheses.

Preparation
It was first synthesized by Henri Moissan in 1891 by burning solid iodine in fluorine gas. This exothermic reaction is still used to produce iodine pentafluoride, although the reaction conditions have been improved.

I2 + 5 F2 → 2 IF5

Reactions
IF5 reacts vigorously with water forming hydrofluoric acid and iodic acid:
IF5 + 3 H2O → HIO3 + 5 HF 
Upon treatment with fluorine, it converts to iodine heptafluoride: 
IF5 + F2 → IF7

It has been used as a solvent for handling metal fluorides.  For example, the reduction of osmium hexafluoride to osmium pentafluoride with iodine is conducted in a solution in iodine pentafluoride:
10 OsF6 +  I2  →   10 OsF5 +  2 IF5

Primary amines react with iodine pentafluoride forming nitriles after hydrolysis

References

Further reading

External links
 WebBook page for IF5
National Pollutant Inventory - fluoride and compounds fact sheet
web elements listing

Fluorides
Iodine compounds
Interhalogen compounds
Fluorinating agents
Oxidizing agents
Inorganic solvents